Physalis angulata is an erect herbaceous annual plant belonging to the nightshade family Solanaceae. Its leaves are dark green and roughly oval, often with tooth shapes around the edge. The flowers are five-sided and pale yellow; the yellow-orange fruits are borne inside a balloon-like calyx. It is native to the Americas, but is now widely distributed and naturalized in tropical and subtropical regions worldwide.

The plant produces edible fruit that can be eaten raw, cooked, jammed, etc. However, all other parts of the plant are poisonous. Members of the Toba-Pilagá ethnic group of Gran Chaco traditionally eat the ripe fruits raw.

Vernacular names
English common names include: angular winter cherry, balloon cherry, cutleaf groundcherry, gooseberry, hogweed, wild tomato, camapu, and occasionally other common names for the genus Physalis.
In Spanish it is known as bolsa mullaca
In Malayalam it is known as njottanjodiyan and mottaampuli.
In Indonesian it is known as ceplukan or ciplukan.
In Suriname it is known as batoto wiwiri.
In Meru it is known as Nkabakabu.
In Egyptian Arabic it is known as Hrankash.
In Yoruba it is known as  Koropo

References

External links

angulata
Edible Solanaceae
Flora of Mexico
Flora of South America
Taxa named by Carl Linnaeus
Plants described in 1753